"Lost Souls" is an original BBC Radio 4 audio play written by Joseph Lidster and is a spin-off from the British science fiction television series Torchwood, itself a spin-off from Doctor Who. It aired on 10 September 2008 in the Afternoon Play slot as part of Radio 4's Big Bang Day which celebrated the switching on of CERN's Large Hadron Collider that same day. Andrew Marr introduced the audio play live from CERN.  An mp3 version of the audio play was freely available until 18 September, when the play was released on CD and as a purchasable download.

Plot

Torchwood Three are chasing a Weevil through Cardiff Bay. Dr. Martha Jones phones Captain Jack Harkness, requesting help. Jack immediately agrees to meet Martha when she says people are disappearing from the CERN facility in Switzerland, where she's working. Martha suggests they go undercover, and Torchwood set off for Geneva.

Gwen Cooper says there aren't any records of the disappearances, but instead on the Large Hadron Collider, or LHC. Jack explains to her and Ianto Jones that CERN seeks the 'Higgs Particle', the fundamental particle of existence. CERN had found a way of examining the building blocks of matter itself; and built the world's largest particle collider which runs from Switzerland to France, in a 27 km round tunnel. Jack excitedly states that the plan is to collide protons moving at the speed of light together, to produce what would effectively be like the "Big Bang". Jack guesses the people may have discovered something unusual and were forcibly removed. He explains that the particle collision is thought to expose parallel dimensions, create black holes or turn the world inside out. After noticing Gwen and Ianto's expressions, Jack assures them that it would all be fine since it's theoretical.

Meeting in Geneva, Martha and the others discuss how they're coping since Toshiko Sato and Dr. Owen Harper's funeral. Gwen replies they're okay, and Martha says she's been spending her time working in Switzerland. She informs Torchwood about her missing friend, Julia Swales. Working as a CERN doctor, Julia realised people were falling ill with undiagnosable symptoms. The patients were sent to a hospital in France because of this, but upon contacting the hospital, Julia was informed the 11 patients never arrived. Julia told Martha, but UNIT couldn't find anything wrong. Martha called Torchwood when Julia disappeared, knowing she'd need their help.

Martha and the team head to the facility, where a reception for the LHC is being held. Martha introduces Ianto as the Welsh Ambassador and Gwen as his wife to the guard, Jack being their assistant. Arriving in what Martha calls an 'underground city' – where the research takes place – the team view the housing of ATLAS, the largest particle detector (Gwen and Ianto describe it as a jet engine the size of the London Eye), and are met by Professor Katrina Johnson.

Being informed that the collider countdown has started, Martha introduces her UNIT boss, Dr Oliver Harrington, who dismisses claims of side effects from the collider activation. Martha mentions his wife's death and that his coping mechanism is to work. She leads them to an ill patient, Leon, who worked as a technician in the tunnel. There aren't any physical signs of injury, and Martha states that he is comatose. Gwen suggests a deep tissue scan, amazing Martha. Gwen mentions that Owen was working on its adaptation before he died. The readings aren't comprehensive; Leon's skin starts glowing. As Martha tries to help Leon, he speaks in a strange voice. Jack suggests they find a link between the patients; Gwen and Ianto head to the control room to hack computers, himself and Martha remaining. They talk about Owen and Tosh; Jack stating he needs to be strong for Gwen and Ianto. Martha doesn't believe it, and Jack dismisses her, lamenting his immortality and the fact he couldn't save them, blaming himself.

Gwen and Ianto search for the patients. According to their findings, the missing people were all in the tunnel when they became sick. Martha notes that Leon is disintegrating, discovering that his neutrons are missing. Jack reveals he'd seen a colony fall victim to a creature the same way. As Gwen and Ianto search for links between the tunnel and the collider, Jack and Martha inform them about Leon. The creature in question feeds on neutrons in the body. They deduce that the bodies are in an unmarked building, and Martha heads there while Jack goes to the Professor. Gwen and Ianto head to the tunnel to locate the creature. Jack instructs them to scan for creatures and not to engage with them, before they split up on bicycles.

Meanwhile, the activation of the collider is about to begin. As Professor Johnson makes a speech, Jack demands the closure of the operation. He reveals himself as Torchwood, explaining that a creature slipped through during a test in May. The Professor asks him about the missing people; Jack assuming she is feigning. Martha contacts Gwen and they talk about Owen and Tosh. Gwen says she can't accept they're gone and that the funeral didn't give her the closure she wanted. Martha finds the building and attempts to enter. After commenting on the lack of sonic screwdriver, she breaks in using a rock, finding Julia and the others in comas.

In the tunnel, the creature poses as Owen, Tosh and Lisa Hallett, tempting Ianto to 'help' them return to life. Gwen contacts Jack, who is trying to stop the activation, informing him that Ianto has found the creature. Martha also contacts him, reporting that she'd found the building and the missing people, who are all glowing. In the tunnel, Ianto is torn between going to Gwen and succumbing to the alien posing as Lisa. Martha, trying to help Julia and the other patients, is held at gunpoint by Dr. Harrington, who reveals himself to be behind their storage. As Gwen reaches Ianto, she resists the alien as she helps Ianto. Ianto expresses his sorrow over losing Tosh, Owen and Lisa, and begs to be with them.

Professor Johnson prepares for lockdown. Jack suggests they use CERN's Anti-Proton Beam Facility to reverse the polarity of the magnets; combining a proton beam and an anti proton beam will cause them to cancel each other out. Dr. Harrington arrives with Martha and demands control. In the tunnel, Gwen struggles with Ianto, who has begun to glow. Harrington states that he'd been contacted by his wife (the creature), and thinks all the dead can come back to life if he helped his wife. Martha tells him that their neutrons are missing and that his wife isn't coming back. He exits, Martha following him.

As Gwen and Ianto struggle towards the exit, Ianto remarks the irony of seeing the wonders of the universe before dying in a tunnel in Switzerland. Gwen reassures him and herself and the alien tempts her to release it. In the Anti-Proton Beam Facility, Jack and the Professor note that they'll see the Higgs Particle because the proton beams will hit the anti proton beams instead, exposing it. They are informed that Harrington activated the tunnel shut down sequence. Gwen and Ianto meet Harrington in the tunnel and he helps her to get them out. Martha arrives and before they can stop him, Harrington heads back to the tunnel, locking himself in. With the tunnel locked down the collider is activated, creating the anti proton beams. Martha informs them about Harrington, Jack realising it's too late to help him. In the tunnel, Harrington and the creature perish in the tunnel as the collider is activated. Jack notes that the comatose patients should return to normal. The Professor thanks Jack before he returns to Gwen, Ianto and Martha.

Ianto thanks Gwen for helping him, although he cannot remember any of it, and Martha reports that all the patients have returned to normal. As Ianto quotes Tennyson, Gwen asks why the human race 'needs to be ready'. Jack simply says that they're worth fighting for, which the others dismiss. Jack says they never stop searching for answers – even when they don't know what the questions are – and that makes them special. Jack states that the answer is somewhere out there, and that sometimes asking the question IS the answer, before they head home.

Continuity
The Torchwood team are still grieving the deaths of their colleagues Owen Harper and Toshiko Sato. They have not seen Martha Jones, who is working for UNIT, since the funeral. Upon greeting Martha, Jack welcomes her with the words "voice of a nightingale", the phrase he greeted her with upon her arrival in the Torchwood episode "Reset" and upon commencing their telephone conversation in the Doctor Who episode "The Stolen Earth". The team are heard in pursuit of recurring Torchwood monsters Weevils and reference is made to Martha's fiancé, Thomas Milligan, a character seen in the Doctor Who episode "Last of the Time Lords" and her friend Julia Swales, a character seen in the Doctor Who episode "Smith and Jones".

An alien creature poses as the ghosts of Owen, Toshiko and Ianto's deceased girlfriend, Lisa Hallett, a character seen in the Torchwood episode "Cyberwoman". Jack uses the phrase "reverse the polarity", a phrase associated with the Third Doctor in Doctor Who. The Bekaran deep-tissue scanner first appeared in the Torchwood spin-off novel Another Life and Martha mentions the sonic screwdriver, a device used by the Doctor. Ianto's phrase on dying in a tunnel in Switzerland also echoes the Ninth Doctor's line on dying in a cellar in Cardiff in "The Unquiet Dead".

Writing
CERN was involved in the production of Lost Souls from its inception; according to writer Joseph Lidster, "they're apparently big Torchwood fans." Representatives from CERN read the script to check for scientific accuracy; they also approved the plot, which required "that if the team were going to CERN, something had to go wrong".

When Lidster began writing the script, he did not know that the characters of Owen and Tosh would be killed in the episode "Exit Wounds", so the characters were included in his first treatment. He subsequently introduced the theme of grief into the episode, to address the characters' reactions to their friends' deaths.

Broadcast and reception
Lost Souls was commissioned and broadcast as part of Radio 4's "Big Bang Day", a day of special programming commemorating the switch-on of the Large Hadron Collider at CERN. As part of the "Big Bang Day" coverage, James Gillies, director of communications for CERN, wrote an article for Radio 4's website comparing the fictional LHC of Lost Souls with the real LHC: "The CERN of reality bears little resemblance to that of Joseph Lidster's Torchwood script. The geography is all wrong and there's no way that anyone could be in the accelerator tunnel while it's running. The cool down happens inside a long blue tube, so the tunnel itself does not get cold. I could go on, but that would be churlish. By ignoring reality, by rearranging geography and by playing with time in his own way, Lidster creates drama." Gillies added "Captain Jack displays a surprising knowledge of particle physics."

Prior to the special's broadcast, the prospect of a radio version of Torchwood yielded mixed responses from the critics. Writing in The Sunday Times, Paul Donovan celebrated the special, particularly the contributions of the "beguiling" and "sympathetic" Freema Agyeman; of the special and the rest of the Big Bang Day programming, Donovan said, "This is the sort of output we pay the licence fee for, the sort of ambitious and expensive programming no commercial radio station could ever hope to do in the present ecology of broadcasting." However, at The Times, Chris Campling lamented "a special radio episode of the terrible Dr Who spinoff Torchwood, set at CERN and involving the supernatural. It's as though Radio 4 approached the point of serious educational broadcasting – and then disappeared into the black hole of celebrity." According to John Barrowman, Lost Souls was the most downloaded radio or television that day on the BBC's iPlayer site, leading to a further three radio episodes being commissioned.

References

External links
"Lost Souls" at BBC Radio 4's website

2008 audio plays
2008 radio dramas
Radio plays based on Torchwood
UNIT audio plays